Zgornja Bela is a settlement west of Preddvor in the Upper Carniola region of Slovenia.

References

External links
Zgornja Bela at Geopedia.si

Populated places in the Municipality of Preddvor